The Taillefer Isthmus (French: Isthme Taillefer) is an Australian isthmus linking Peron Peninsula to the coast of Western Australia in the Gascoyne region.

Its western coast is formed by Henri Freycinet Harbour, its eastern one by L'Haridon Bight, both bodies of waters being part of Shark Bay.

The isthmus is named after Hubert Jules Taillefer, a French physician who took part in the Baudin expedition to Australia.  It was later traversed by Augustus Charles Gregory.

References

Taillefer
Shark Bay